Toni Koivisto (born 5 November 1982 in Ylitornio) is a Finnish former professional ice hockey forward. His career spanned 21 seasons and was played in top leagues in Finland, Sweden, and Russia.

Playing career
A native of Ylitornio, in Finnish Lapland, Koivisto moved to Rauma as a teenager in 1998 to play for Lukko, as northern Finland lacked an SM-liiga team at that time. After one year spent with the Lukko junior-A team, Koivisto debuted in the SM-liiga in the 1999–2000 season, although he still split his time between the adult and the junior teams. In 2000, Koivisto appeared in the U18 World Championships and won the gold medal with Team Finland. He also represented Finland in the 2001 and 2002 World Junior Championships, coming home with silver and bronze, respectively.

After six mediocre seasons with Lukko, Koivisto moved to Tampere to play for Ilves. In his first season there he reached for the first time the 30 points mark, and the 40 points mark in the two following seasons.

In 2008, Koivisto returned to the north to play for Oulun Kärpät, the closest major club to Ylitornio, which had been promoted to SM-liiga in his absence. In Oulu, Koivisto rose to stardom, scoring 62 points in 58 games during both of his two seasons with Kärpät.

Koivisto signed a two-year contract with Metallurg Magnitogorsk of the Kontinental Hockey League (KHL) on 26 May 2009. In his first season with Metallurg in 2009–10, Koivisto struggled offensively scoring only 19 points in 51 games, he forwent his final year and signed a new two-year contract with Frölunda HC of the Swedish Elitserien (SEL) on 20 May 2010.

After scoring only 1 goal in the 2011–12 season's first 17 games, Frölunda and Koivisto decided to split apart on 31 October 2011. He subsequently signed a one-season contract with Luleå HF of the same league (Elitserien) on 6 November 2011, expiring after the end of the 2011–12 season.

Career statistics

Regular season and playoffs

International

References

External links

1982 births
Finnish expatriate ice hockey players in Russia
Finnish expatriate ice hockey players in Sweden
Finnish ice hockey left wingers
Florida Panthers draft picks
Frölunda HC players
Ilves players
Living people
Lukko players
Luleå HF players
Metallurg Magnitogorsk players
Oulun Kärpät players
People from Ylitornio
Sportspeople from Lapland (Finland)